First Comics is an American comic book company.

Titles

0–9

A
Alter Ego (4 issues)
American Flagg! (50 issues, plus special, then 12 issue series)
Alien Bones (graphic novel, 2019)

B
Badger (70 issues, plus a 4 issue limited series and two graphic novels)
Beowulf (graphic novel, 1984)
Betty Boop's Big Break (graphic novel, 1990)

C
Corum (Michael Moorcock adaptation):
The Chronicles of Corum (12 issues, 1987-1988)
The Bull and the Spear (4 issues, 1989)
Classics Illustrated (27 issues, 1990–1991)
Crossroads (5 issues, 1988)

D
Dreadstar (from Epic Comics, 38 issues, 1986–1991)
Dynamo Joe (15 issues, plus 1 special, 1986–1988)

E
Elric (Michael Moorcock adaptation):
Sailor on the Seas of Fate (7 issues, 1985-1986)
Elric of Melnibone (1 issue, 1986)
Weird of the White Wolf (5 issues, 1986-1987)
The Vanishing Tower (6 issues, 1987-1988)
The Bane of the Black Sword (6 issues, 1988)
E-Man (from Charlton Comics, 25 issues then goes to Comico)
The Enchanted Apples of Oz (graphic novel, 1987)
Evangeline (from Comico, 12 issues, 1987–1989)

F
First Adventures (5 issues, anthology series featuring Whisper, Blaze Barlow, and Dynamo Joe)
The Forgotten Forest of Oz (graphic novel, 1988)

G
The Gift (one-shot)
Grimjack (81 issues, plus a limited series and a graphic novel)
Ghostbusters (4 issues, based on the Filmation series)

H
Hammer of God: Sword of Justice (2 issue mini-series, tie-in with Nexus)
Hawkmoon (Michael Moorcock adaptation):
The Jewel in the Skull (4 issue mini-series, 1986)
The Mad God's Amulet (4 issue mini-series, 1987)
The Sword of Dawn (4 issue mini-series, 1987)
The Runestaff (4 issue mini-series, 1988)

I
Inspector Oh (regular series, 2016)
The Ice King of Oz (graphic novel, 1987)

J
Jon Sable, Freelance (56 issues, 1983–1988)
Mike Grell's Sable (10 issues, 1990, reprinting John Sable, Freelance)

K

L
Lone Wolf and Cub (45 issues)
Love Town (regular series, 2018)

M
Mars (12 issues)
Mazinger (graphic novel)
Meta-4 (3 issues)
Munden's Bar (2 specials)

N
Nexus (80 issues, plus several limited series)

O
Original E-Man & Michael Mauser (7 issues)

P
The P.I.s: Michael Mauser & Ms. Tree (3 issues, 1985)
Psychoblast (9 issues, 1987–1988)

Q

R

S
Sable (27 issues)
The Secret Island of Oz (graphic novel, 1987)Sensei (4 issues)Serving Supes (ongoing)Shatter (14 issues, plus a special)Starslayer (from Pacific Comics, 28 issues)Squalor (4 issues)

TTeam Yankee (6 issues, followed by graphic novel)Teenage Mutant Ninja Turtles (4 graphic novels)Time Beavers (graphic novel)Time² (two graphic novels)Twilight Man (4 issues)

U

V

WWarp (19 issues, plus 3 specials)Whisper (37 issues, plus a special)Witch Finder General (6 issue mini-series)

X

Y

ZZen: Hard Bounty (6 issues)Zen: Home (one-shot)Zero Tolerance'' (4 issues)

References

First Comics at the Big Comic Book DataBase

First Comics